The Green Hat is a four-act play written by Michael Arlen as an adaptation of his 1924 novel of the same name. Producer A. H. Woods staged it on Broadway, where it opened at the Broadhurst Theatre on September 15, 1925.

Cast and characters

The characters and cast from the Broadway production are given below:

References

External links
 
 Full text of the novel at the Internet Archive

1925 plays
Broadway plays
English-language plays
Plays based on novels